Feel the Blade is a 2008 album by thrash metal/death metal band Legion of the Damned. It is actually a re-release of Elegy for the Weak, originally released under the name of Occult, the prior incarnation of Legion of the Damned under singer Rachel Heyzer, and contains an altered track list. Lyrical topics on the album include horror motifs, the devastation of nuclear war and violent occult themes. Serial murder plays a more prominent role in this album than in later writings, with "Nocturnal Predator" about Richard Ramirez actually quoting the killer in the lyrics ("Lucifer dwells within us all"). The final bonus track is a cover of a Pestilence song (guest appearance by Martin van Drunen).

Track listing 
"Nuclear Torment" – 3:44
"Nocturnal Predator" – 4:12
"Slaughtering the Pigs" – 4:20
"Slut of Sodom" – 3:46
"Feel the Blade" – 4:19
"Expire" – 2:24
"Warbeast" – 2:58
"Disturbing the Dead" – 3:27
"Obsessed by the Grave" – 5:13
"Reaper's Call" – 3:21
"Last Command"*
"Mask of Terror"*
"Chronic Infection (feat. Martin van Drunen)"*

The songs 11–13 are bonus tracks.
Chronic Infection is originally by Pestilence

Personnel
Maurice Swinkels – vocals
Richard Ebisch – guitar
Harold Gielen – bass
Erik Fleuren – drums

References

External links
Official website

2008 albums
Legion of the Damned (band) albums
Massacre Records albums
Cultural depictions of Richard Ramirez
Albums produced by Andy Classen